Austrocallerya australis, commonly known as native wisteria, blunt wisteria or Samson's sinew in Australia, is a species of flowering plant in the family Fabaceae, native to north-eastern Australia, New Guinea and some Pacific Islands. It is a tall, woody climber with pinnate leaves, the leaflets oblong, elliptic or egg-shaped, and panicles of purple, pea-like flowers.

Description

Taxonomy
This species was first formally described in 1833 by Stephan Endlicher who gave it the name Pterocarpus australis in his book Prodromus Florae Norfolkicae from specimens collected on Norfolk Island by Ferdinand Bauer. In 1994, Anne M. Schot moved the species to Callerya as Callerya australis in the journal Blumea and in 2019, James A. Compton and Brian David Schrire moved it to their new genus Austrocallerya as Austrocallerya australis, based on the plant's morphology, and nuclear and chloroplast DNA sequences. The specific epithet (australis) means "southern".

Distribution and habitat
According to Plants of the World Online, it also occurs in New Guinea, New Caledonia, and the Cook, Solomon, Tuamotus and Tubuai Islands.

Conservation status
Austrocallerya australis is listed as "least concern" under the Queensland Government Nature Conservation Act 1992.

References

Wisterieae
Flora of the Cook Islands
Flora of New Caledonia
Flora of New Guinea
Flora of New South Wales
Flora of Norfolk Island
Flora of Queensland
Flora of the Solomon Islands (archipelago)
Flora of the Tuamotus
Flora of the Tubuai Islands
Plants described in 1833